The Republic of Poland Ambassador to Ireland is the ambassador extraordinary and plenipotentiary from the Republic of Poland to Ireland. The current ambassador is Anna Sochańska.

The main embassy building is located in Ballsbridge, affluent neighbourhood in the City of Dublin. The ambassador's residence is located on the same street as embassy building. The Consular and Polish Diaspora Section of the embassy is located in the centre of Dublin, on the Eden Quay, next to the O'Connell Bridge.

History 
Before Second World War Poland did not establish diplomatic relations with Ireland. First diplomatic relations between the two countries were established in 1976, however until 1991, Poland Ambassador to Ireland was not residing in Ireland. The Embassy of Poland in Dublin was opened in 1991.

List of ambassadors of Poland to Ireland

Polish People's Republic 

 1977-1979: Stanisław Pichla (Poland Ambassador to Denmark, accredited to Ireland)
 1979-1981: Jerzy Feliksiak (Poland Ambassador to Belgium, accredited to Ireland)
 1981-1984: Alojzy Bartoszek (Poland Ambassador to Netherlands, accredited to Ireland)
 1984-1987: Stefan Staniszewski (Poland Ambassador to the United Kingdom, accredited to Ireland)
 1987-1990: Zbigniew Gertych (Poland Ambassador to the United Kingdom, accredited to Ireland)

Third Polish Republic 

 1990-1991: Tadeusz de Virion (Poland Ambassador to the United Kingdom, accredited to Ireland)
 1991-1995: Ernest Bryll
 1995-1996: Marek Grela (chargé d’affaires)
 1996-1997: Stanisław Szymański
 1997-2002: Janusz Skolimowski
 2002-2006: Witold Sobków
 2006-2010: Tadeusz Szumowski
 2010-2015: Marcin Nawrot
 2015-2018: Ryszard Sarkowicz
 2018-2019: Łukasz Chimiak (chargé d’affaires)
 since 2019: Anna Sochańska

References 

Ireland
Poland